, also called Kumano Kaidō or Tropical Route is a national highway connecting Hamamatsu, Shizuoka and Wakayama, Wakayama in Japan.  Part of the route requires crossing Ise Bay on the Ise-wan Ferry.

It is the 8th longest national highway in Japan.

Route data
Length: 504.6 km (313.5 mi)
Origin: Hamamatsu (originates at junction with Route 1)
Terminus: Wakayama city
Major cities: Tahara, Toba, Ise, Matsusaka, Owase, Kumano, Shingū, Tanabe, and Gobō

History
Route 42 was originally designated in January 1945 as a section of Route 41 (the Kumano Highway), which ran to Tokyo. This ran concurrent with Route 1 (now Route 1/Route 23). On 18 May 1953 Route 41 was classified as a Class 2 highway and redesignated as Route 170, which was later redesignated as Route 42 when the route was promoted to a Class 1 highway.

Passes through
Shizuoka Prefecture
Hamamatsu • Kosai
Aichi Prefecture
Toyohashi • Tahara
Mie Prefecture
Toba • Ise • Meiwa • Matsusaka • Taki • Ōdai • Taiki • Kihoku • Owase • Kumano • Mihama • Kihō
Wakayama Prefecture
Shingū • Nachikatsuura • Taiji • Kushimoto • Susami • Shirahama • Minabe • Inami • Gobō • Hidaka • Yura • Hirogawa • Yuasa • Aridagawa • Arida • Kainan • Wakayama

Intersects with

Shizuoka Prefecture
Route 1
Route 257
Route 301
Aichi Prefecture
Route 259
Mie Prefecture
Route 167
Route 23
Route 166
Ise Expressway
Route 368
Kisei Expressway
Route 260
Route 425
Route 311
Route 309
Route 311
Wakayama Prefecture
Route 168
Route 371
Route 311
Hanwa Expressway
Route 424
Route 425
Yuasa-Gobō Bypass
Route 480
Route 24
Route 26

References

042
Roads in Aichi Prefecture
Roads in Mie Prefecture
Roads in Shizuoka Prefecture
Roads in Wakayama Prefecture